Luca Alexander Sosa (born 11 June 1994) is an Argentine professional footballer who plays as a defender for Barcelona.

Career
Sosa's career with Huracán started in 2014. He was an unused substitute in ten Primera B Nacional matches in 2013–14, on the third occasion he was subbed on for Eduardo Domínguez to make his professional debut in a draw versus Aldosivi on 12 April. He made just one league appearance in 2013–14, likewise in 2014. Sosa was subsequently loaned to Talleres of Torneo Federal A in February 2015. He made his debut on 11 October against Cipolletti and scored the club's second goal in a 1–3 win. After a further appearance against Unión Aconquija days later, Sosa returned to parent club, now of the Argentine Primera División, Huracán.

In July 2017, after two goals in fourteen games for Huracán, Sosa signed a new contract with the club until June 2019 and immediately joined fellow Primera División side Patronato on loan. However, after returning from his Patronato loan, Sosa departed Huracán to sign for Deportivo Cuenca of the Ecuadorian Serie A.

Sosa joined Guayaquil City for the 2019 season.

On January 14, 2021, Sosa joined Ecuadorian Serie A side, Emelec, on a one-year loan with the option to buy.

Career statistics
.

Honours
Huracán
Copa Argentina: 2013–14

Talleres
Torneo Federal A: 2015

References

External links

1994 births
Living people
People from La Matanza Partido
Argentine footballers
Association football defenders
Argentine expatriate footballers
Expatriate footballers in Ecuador
Argentine expatriate sportspeople in Ecuador
Primera Nacional players
Argentine Primera División players
Torneo Federal A players
Ecuadorian Serie A players
Club Atlético Huracán footballers
Talleres de Córdoba footballers
Club Atlético Patronato footballers
C.D. Cuenca footballers
Guayaquil City F.C. footballers
Sportspeople from Buenos Aires Province